Route nationale 10  (RN 10) is an unpaved, secondary highway in Madagascar of 512 km, running from Andranovory to Ambovombe. It crosses the regions of Atsimo-Andrefana and Androy.

Selected locations on route
West to East:
Andranovory - intersection with RN 7 (Tulear - Fianarantsoa - Antananarivo)
Tameantsoa - Onilahy River crossing
Betioky - Beza Mahafaly Reserve at 35 km north-east
Ambatry
Mahazoarivo - intersection secondary road to Vohitsara and Akazomateila (Mahafaly graves) & Tsimanampetsotse National Park
Ejeda - dirt road to the coast to Itampolo & Linta River crossing
Manakaralahy -  Manakaralahy River crossing
Sakoambe
Ampanihy
Tranoroa - Menarandra River crossing
Andamilamy
Beloha
Tsiombe
Ambondro
Ambovombe - intersection with RN 13 (Ihosy - Tôlanaro)

See also
List of roads in Madagascar
Transport in Madagascar

References

Roads in Atsimo-Andrefana
Roads in Androy
Roads in Madagascar